Pál Bedő (4 December 1895 – 22 April 1965) was a Hungarian athlete. He competed in the men's shot put at the 1924 Summer Olympics.

References

External links
 

1895 births
1965 deaths
Athletes (track and field) at the 1924 Summer Olympics
Hungarian male shot putters
Olympic athletes of Hungary
Place of birth missing
20th-century Hungarian people